Thomas Paulus (born 14 March 1982 in Kelheim, Lower Bavaria) is a German former footballer who last played for SSV Jahn Regensburg. He spent three seasons in the Bundesliga with 1. FC Nürnberg. He retired at the end of the 2016–17 season and became the manager of the Jahn Fußballschule (Jahn Footballing School).

Honours
1. FC Nürnberg
 DFB-Pokal: 2006–07

References

1982 births
Living people
People from Kelheim
Sportspeople from Lower Bavaria
German footballers
1. FC Nürnberg players
FC Erzgebirge Aue players
SSV Jahn Regensburg players
Bundesliga players
2. Bundesliga players
3. Liga players
Regionalliga players
Association football defenders
Footballers from Bavaria